Gambut may refer to:
 Gâmbuț, a village in Bichiș Commune, Mureș County, Romania
 Gambut, or Kambut, a village in eastern Libya